Niklas Jeck (born 18 September 2001) is a German professional footballer who plays as a centre-back for Wormatia Worms.

Career
A native of Stollberg, Jeck joined Erzgebirge Aue's academy in 2008 and graduated through their academy whilst attending . He joined VfB Auerbach on a season-long loan on 30 August 2019. He made 14 appearances in the Regionalliga Nordost across the 2019–20 season. He made his 2. Bundesliga debut for Erzgebirge Aue as an 88th-minute substitute in an 8–3 home defeat to SC Paderborn on 9 May 2021.

Jeck moved to Union Titus Pétange on loan for the 2021–22 season.

On 18 January 2023, Jeck signed with Wormatia Worms.

Career statistics

References

External links

2001 births
Living people
German footballers
Association football central defenders
2. Bundesliga players
Regionalliga players
Luxembourg National Division players
FC Erzgebirge Aue players
VfB Auerbach players
Union Titus Pétange players
Wormatia Worms players
German expatriate footballers
German expatriate sportspeople in Luxembourg
Expatriate footballers  in Luxembourg